The Schwalm is a river in Hesse, Germany, right tributary of the Eder. It rises on the north side of the Vogelsberg Mountains. It flows north through Alsfeld, Schwalmstadt and Borken. The main tributaries are the Efze, the Gilsa, the Grenff and the Antrift.

References

Rivers of Hesse
Rivers of the Vogelsberg
 
Rivers of Germany